Clematis terniflora (sweet autumn clematis, sweet autumn virginsbower) is a plant in the buttercup family, Ranunculaceae. It is native to northeastern Asia (China, Japan, Korea, Mongolia, Russia (Siberia), Taiwan). It was introduced into the United States in the late 1800s as an ornamental garden plant, and has naturalized in many of the eastern states. It is considered a Category II invasive plant in Florida (north and central) and some other eastern states, meaning invading native plant communities but not yet seen as displacing native species.

Description
Clematis terniflora is a vine with opposite, pinnately compound leaves, on climbing stems. The flowers are white, borne in fall. The blooms are nicely fragrant and visited by bees. In late fall the fertilized flowers become fruit (seed) clusters of 5-6 fruits connected at the heads and each having a long white tail. As these dry, the color of the fruits fade and the tail becomes feather-like. In the spring the fruits detach and are dispersed by wind.

Culture
Prefers full sun, but will prosper and bloom in partial shade. These woody-stemmed plants can be pruned in fall or early spring to within a couple of feet from the ground, and will vine up fence, trellis, arbors (or other plants) to heights of 10 to 30 feet. Can also be allowed to sprawl along the ground as a dense ground cover. Blooms on new growth. No serious insect or disease problems. Does not require fertilizer or frequent watering, although will benefit from a low nitrogen fertilizer such as 5-10-10 in spring. Considered deer resistant.

References

External links

Clematis terniflora Floridata Plant Encyclopedia
Sweet Autumn Clematis (Clematis terniflora) Trees, Shrubs, and Woody Vines of North Carolina.

terniflora
Flora of China
Flora of Japan
Flora of Korea
Flora of Mongolia
Flora of Siberia
Flora of Taiwan